Michael DiPietro (born June 9, 1999) is a Canadian professional ice hockey goaltender currently playing for the Maine Mariners of the ECHL as a prospect to the Boston Bruins of the National Hockey League (NHL). He was selected by the Canucks in the third round (64th overall) of the 2017 NHL Entry Draft, and played 3 games with them between 2019 and 2022, mainly playing with their minor league affiliates.

Playing career
DiPietro began playing hockey as a defenceman until he was nine years old when he switched to goaltender after watching his step-brother play the position.

Prior to being drafted into the OHL, DiPietro played with the Sun County Panthers Minor Midget AAA team. During the 2014–15 season, DiPietro played in 21 games and posted a .862 save percentage.

DiPietro was drafted in the second round, 23rd overall, by the Windsor Spitfires in the 2015 OHL Draft. During his rookie season, DiPietro had a 16–8–1 record while posting a save percentage of .912. He was awarded the F. W. "Dinty" Moore Trophy at the conclusion of his rookie year for being the rookie goaltender with the best goals against average, becoming the first Spitfires player to ever win the award. He was also named to the OHL First All-Rookie Team.

In his sophomore year, DiPietro helped guide the Spitfires to a Memorial Cup victory, posting a .932 save percentage during Windsor’s championship win. For his efforts, DiPietro was awarded the Hap Emms Memorial Trophy, named to the Memorial Cup All-Star Team and the OHL Third All-Star Team.

After two successful seasons, scouts started to take notice. Bill Sloan, Head Scout South of the Mason Dixon, was quick to note his potential. As such, prior to his junior season, DiPietro was drafted 64th overall by the Vancouver Canucks in the 2017 NHL Entry Draft. Unsigned by the Canucks, DiPietro rejoined the Spitfires for the 2017–18 season. In his junior season, DiPietro posted a 29–21–3–1 record with seven shutouts and a .910 save percentage. For his efforts, DiPietro was named OHL Goaltender of the Year and to the OHL First All-Star Team.

On May 31, 2018, the Canucks signed DiPietro to a three-year entry-level contract. DiPietro began the 2018–19 season in the OHL after attending Canucks training camp. On October 28, after a 4–1 win over the Owen Sound Attack, DiPietro set a Spitfires franchise record for most wins in Spitfires history with his 79th. DiPietro started the 2018–19 season with the Spitfires, posting a .920 save percentage in 21 starts. On December 4, he was traded to the Ottawa 67's in exchange for Egor Afanaseyev and drafts picks ranging from 2019 to 2023. 

On February 5, 2019, DiPietro was called up to the NHL on an emergency basis after starter Thatcher Demko was injured. He made his NHL debut on February 11 in a 7–2 loss to the San Jose Sharks, stopping 17 of 24 shots. By making his debut, DiPietro became the second youngest Canucks goaltender in franchise history, only being surpassed by Troy Gamble. He was returned to the Ottawa 67's the following night.

On March 18, 2019, DiPietro and teammate Cedrick Andree were announced as the co-winners of the Dave Pinkney Trophy for allowing the fewest goals against in the league. In 17 games with the Ottawa 67's, DiPietro had a 12–4–0–0 record with a 2.50 goals-against-average. In the playoffs, DiPietro had a 13–0 record with the 67's before suffering an injury in the OHL finals, and did not return as the Guelph Storm won the OHL championship.

On January 21, 2022, DiPietro would be called up to the NHL on an emergency basis after starter Thatcher Demko was placed into the NHL's COVID-19 protocol. On January 23, he would return to the NHL by starting against the St. Louis Blues in a 3–1 loss after goaltender Spencer Martin was also placed on the COVID-19 protocol, stopping 14 of 17 shots. On January 27, DiPietro would then be assigned to the Taxi Squad, and would eventually be sent down along with Sheldon Dries to the Abbotsford Canucks a day later on January 28.

Unable to find traction within the Canucks organization and having earlier submitted a trade request, DiPietro entered his fourth professional season in 2022–23 assigned to the Abbotsford Canucks. Before making his season debut, DiPietro was traded by the Canucks to the Boston Bruins, along with prospect Jonathan Myrenberg, in exchange for Jack Studnicka on October 27, 2022.

International play

After being a late cut from Team Canada's 2018 IIHF World Junior Championship roster, DiPietro eventually made his World Juniors debut during the 2019 IIHF World Junior Championships. In the first game of the tournament on December 26, 2018, DiPietro recorded a shut-out in a 14–0 win over Denmark. In Canada's final game of the preliminary round, DiPietro was named Canada's best player of the game in a 2–1 loss to Russia. He ended the preliminary round with a .957 save percentage. On January 2, Canada was eliminated from the World Juniors tournament in a heartbreaking 2–1 overtime loss in the quarterfinals to Team Finland.

DiPietro was named to Team Canada for the 2021 IIHF World Championship and the 2022 Spengler Cup.

Personal life
While they share a last name, DiPietro is not related to former Montreal Canadiens forward Paul DiPietro, or former New York Islanders goalie Rick DiPietro. DiPietro models his game after Los Angeles Kings goalie Jonathan Quick. He has a tattoo celebrating winning the Memorial Cup.

Career statistics

Regular season and playoffs

International

Awards and honours

References

External links

1999 births
Living people
Abbotsford Canucks players
Canadian ice hockey goaltenders
Canadian people of Italian descent
Ice hockey people from Ontario
Maine Mariners (ECHL) players
Ottawa 67's players
Providence Bruins players
Sportspeople from Windsor, Ontario
Utica Comets players
Vancouver Canucks draft picks
Vancouver Canucks players
Windsor Spitfires players